Yannick Salem Louniangou is a former professional footballer who played as a forward. Born in France, he represented Congo at international level.

Club career
The first three clubs that Salem played for were Grenoble, Créteil and Châteauroux. In 2005, he moved to Dutch team De Graafschap before joining AGOVV Apeldoorn in 2006. He went on a trial with Nottingham Forest in August 2007. In 2008 Salem moved to Belgian club K.S.K. Beveren and then the following season to German side Eintracht Trier having agreed a two-year contract until summer 2011.

On 30 October 2010, Salem signed a short-term deal at Stockport County in England.

International career
Salem was called up to the Congo national team on a number of occasions. He made his debut in an African Cup Of Nations qualifier against Zambia in 2007, and has at least a further two caps from friendlies in 2009 against North Korea and Angola. He was also called up for a game against Morocco, but had to withdraw from the squad.

Personal life
Salem was born in Amiens, France to parents from the Republic of the Congo. He has six brothers and three sisters.

References

External links

1983 births
Living people
Sportspeople from Amiens
French sportspeople of Republic of the Congo descent
Republic of the Congo footballers
French footballers
Footballers from Hauts-de-France
Association football forwards
Republic of the Congo international footballers
Eerste Divisie players
Liga I players
US Créteil-Lusitanos players
SV Eintracht Trier 05 players
De Graafschap players
AGOVV Apeldoorn players
K.S.K. Beveren players
Grenoble Foot 38 players
CS Concordia Chiajna players
AFC Telford United players
Republic of the Congo expatriate footballers
French expatriate footballers
Expatriate footballers in Belgium
Expatriate footballers in Germany
Expatriate footballers in the Netherlands
Expatriate footballers in England
Expatriate footballers in Romania
French expatriate sportspeople in Belgium
French expatriate sportspeople in Germany
French expatriate sportspeople in the Netherlands
French expatriate sportspeople in England
French expatriate sportspeople in Romania
Republic of the Congo expatriate sportspeople in Belgium
Republic of the Congo expatriate sportspeople in Germany
Republic of the Congo expatriate sportspeople in the Netherlands
Republic of the Congo expatriate sportspeople in England
Republic of the Congo expatriate sportspeople in Romania